
Soppensee is a lake in Canton of Lucerne, Switzerland. The lake and its surroundings are located in the municipalities of Buttisholz, Menznau and Ruswil.

Lakes of Switzerland
Lakes of the canton of Lucerne
LSoppensee